Lemyra philippinica is a moth of the family Erebidae. It was described by Thomas in 1990. It is found on the Philippines (Luzon, Mindanao, Leite, Negros, Sebu). It is found in primary and secondary habitats, ranging from the lowlands up to altitudes of about 2,000 meters.

References

 

philippinica
Moths described in 1990